Sympetrum navasi is a species of dragonfly in the family Libellulidae. It is found in Benin, Botswana, Ivory Coast, Gambia, Ghana, Kenya, Liberia, Malawi, Namibia, Nigeria, Sierra Leone, Uganda, Zambia, Zimbabwe, possibly Burundi, and possibly Tanzania. Its natural habitats are shrub-dominated wetlands, swamps, freshwater marshes, and intermittent freshwater marshes.

References

Libellulidae
Odonata of Africa
Insects described in 1921
Taxonomy articles created by Polbot
Taxobox binomials not recognized by IUCN